The 2021 CAF Super Cup (officially the TotalEnergies CAF Super Cup 2021 for sponsorship reasons) was the 30th CAF Super Cup, an annual football match in Africa organized by the Confederation of African Football (CAF), between the winners of the previous season's two CAF club competitions, the CAF Champions League and the CAF Confederation Cup.

The match was played between Al Ahly from Egypt, the 2020–21 CAF Champions League winners, and Raja CA from Morocco, the 2020–21 CAF Confederation Cup winners, at the Ahmed bin Ali Stadium in Al Rayyan, Qatar on 22 December 2021. Al Ahly won the match 6–5 on penalties, after the original match ended as a 1–1 draw, to win their record-extending eighth and second consecutive title.

Teams

Format
The CAF Super Cup is played as a single match at a neutral venue, with the CAF Champions League winners designated as the "home" team for administrative purposes. If the score is tied at the end of regulation, extra time will not be played, and the penalty shoot-out will be used to determine the winner (CAF Champions League Regulations XXVII and CAF Confederation Cup Regulations XXV).

Background
The match was the fourth (and second consecutive) CAF Super Cup to feature an Egyptian and a Moroccan team, with all previous matches ending in favor of the Egyptian side. Al Ahly qualified to the match after defeating South African side Kaizer Chiefs 3–0 in the 2021 CAF Champions League Final. Raja CA earned a place in the match after defeating JS Kabylie of Algeria 2–1 in the 2021 CAF Confederation Cup Final.

This was the seventh meeting between both teams in African competition. All of the previous six encounters were in the Champions League group stage. Raja CA won two matches, including a famous victory in Cairo during their 1999 winning campaign, three matches ended as a draw, and only one win for Al Ahly; a 1–0 victory in 2005 when they won the competition.

Match

Details

Statistics

See also
2021 CAF Champions League Final
2021 CAF Confederation Cup Final

Notes

References

External links
CAFonline.com

2021
Super Cup
International club association football competitions hosted by Qatar
December 2021 sports events in Asia
Al Ahly SC matches
Raja CA matches
CAF Super Cup 2021